James Edward Proctor Jr. (June 14, 1936 – September 10, 2015) was an American politician who represented district 27A in the Maryland House of Delegates.

Background
James Proctor was born in Washington, D.C. on June 14, 1936. He grew up in Washington and attended Dunbar High School. He served in U.S. Air Force from 1961 to 1962 and again in 1968. Following the service he entered Bowie State College and earned his B.S. in elementary education in 1969, and then his M.Ed in 1972. After 17 years as a secondary school principal, Proctor retired from the education arena and devoted himself full-time to the political arena. He died on September 10, 2015 of heart disease.

In the legislature

Proctor became a member of the House of Delegates in May 1990 when he was appointed to fill the vacancy caused when Delegate William R. McCaffrey retired. He served on the Rules and Executive Nominations Committee, the Spending Affordability Committee and was a member of the Legislative Black Caucus of Maryland. He also served as the vice-chairman of the House Appropriations Committee until his death in 2015.

His widow, Elizabeth G. (Susie) Proctor, was appointed to his seat by Maryland Governor Larry Hogan on October 9, 2015.

Election results

2006
Voters to choose two:
{| class="wikitable"
|-
!Name
!Votes
!Percent
!Outcome
|-
|- 
|James E. Proctor Jr., Democratic
|19,829
|  40.3%
|   Won
|-
|- 
|Joseph F. Vallario Jr., Democratic
|18,677
|  38.0%
|   Won
|-
|- 
|Kenneth S. Brown, Democratic
|5,687
|  11.6%
|   Lost
|-
|- 
|Antoinette "Toni" Jarboe-Duley, Democratic
|4,948
|  10.1%
|   Lost
|-
|}

Notes

Democratic Party members of the Maryland House of Delegates
African-American state legislators in Maryland
1936 births
2015 deaths
People from Washington, D.C.
Bowie State University alumni
People from Prince George's County, Maryland
21st-century American politicians
Dunbar High School (Washington, D.C.) alumni
21st-century African-American politicians
20th-century African-American people